Geniostoma ligustrifolium, commonly known as hangehange, is a species of plant in the Loganiaceae family (syn., Geniostoma rupestre var. ligustrifolium). It is endemic to New Zealand, where it is found on the North Island, and in Marlborough at the northern tip of the South Island. It is popular as a garden specimen.

References

External links

 Museum of New Zealand Object: Hangehange, Geniostoma rupestre var. ligustrifolium (A.Cunn.) B.J.Conn; paralectotype of Geniostoma ligustrifolium A.Cunn.

ligustrifolium
Flora of New Zealand
Plants described in 1838